The 1924 West Virginia Wesleyan Bobcats football team represented West Virginia Wesleyan College as an independent during the 1924 college football season. In their fourth and final season under head coach Bob Higgins, the Bobcats compiled a 9–2 record and outscored their opponents by a total of 182 to 78. On September 27. West Virginia Wesleyan was defeated by the West Virginia Mountaineers in the first game played at the new Mountaineer Field The Bobcats were invited to the 1925 Dixie Classic, their first and only bowl game appearance in program history, where they defeated SMU, 9 to 7.

Schedule

References

West Virginia Wesleyan
West Virginia Wesleyan Bobcats football seasons
West Virginia Wesleyan Bobcats football